Ryan Munce (born April 16, 1985) is a Canadian former professional ice hockey goaltender. He now runs his own goalie school called Ryan Munce Goaltending School. Munce was selected by the Los Angeles Kings in the third round (82nd overall) of the 2003 NHL Entry Draft.

On July 28, 2005, the Los Angeles Kings signed Munce to a three-year, entry-level contract.

International 
Munce backstopped Team Canada to a gold medal at the 2003 IIHF World U18 Championships, where he posted the tournament's best goals against average of 1.83.

Today 
Munce started up his own goalie school in 2010 while rehabbing an injury sustained in Italy. Ryan Munce Goaltending School has quickly grown and now has a large following. Munce is also the goaltending scout for OHL's Central Scouting and happily married.

Awards and honours

References

External links

1985 births
Living people
Bakersfield Condors (1998–2015) players
Bossier-Shreveport Mudbugs players
Canadian ice hockey goaltenders
Charlotte Checkers (2010–) players
Ice hockey people from Ontario
Johnstown Chiefs players
Los Angeles Kings draft picks
Mississippi Sea Wolves players
Norfolk Admirals players
Reading Royals players
Sarnia Sting players
Sportspeople from Mississauga
Syracuse Crunch players
Canadian expatriate ice hockey players in the United States